Copyright expiration may refer to:
 Expiration of copyright under Public domain
Copyright expiration in Australia